Cosmas Magaya (5 October 1953 – 10 July 2020) was a Zimbabwean mbira musician.

Background
Raised in the rural areas of Mhondoro-Ngezi, Magaya played a role in the research of musicologist Paul Berliner's books The Soul of Mbira (1978), The Art of Mbira (2019), coauthored with Berliner Mbira's Restless Dance (2020) and also performed mbira on the accompanying Soul of Mbira audio recordings released by Nonesuch Records. Magaya performed internationally in Europe and the United States with Mhuri Yekwa Rwizi, and the Zimbabwe Group Leaders Mbira Ensemble, including members Hakurotwi Mude, Beauler Dyoko, Chaka Chawasarira, Simon Magaya and Paul Berliner.

Magaya died from COVID-19 during the COVID-19 pandemic in Zimbabwe on 10 July 2020.

Leadership positions
Aside from his activities in music, Magaya was also Program Director for Nhimbe for Progress, a non-profit organization serving impoverished villagers in the Mhondoro region of Zimbabwe, and he sat on the Board of Directors of Tariro, a grassroots non-profit organization working in Zimbabwe to prevent the spread of HIV/AIDS by educating young women and girls. Cosmas Magaya was also the Village Head of Magaya/Zvidzai Village under Chief Nherera of Mhondoro.

References

External links
 Soul of Mbira Book on University of Chicago Press Website
 Soul of Mbira CD Recording, Nonesuch website
 Cosmas Magaya bio on Kutsinhira Cultural Arts Center website 
 Nhimbe for Progress
 Tariro
 Interview and live performance with Cosmas Magaya, Originally broadcast on WKCR 89.9 FM-NY
 

Zimbabwean musicians
1953 births
2020 deaths
People from Mashonaland West Province
Deaths from the COVID-19 pandemic in Zimbabwe